Bouçã Dam is a concrete double curvature arch dam on the Zêzere River, where the river forms the border line between the districts of Castelo Branco and Leiria. It is located in the municipality Pedrógão Grande, in Leiria District, Portugal.

The dam was completed in 1955. It is owned by Companhia Portuguesa de Produção de Electricidade (CPPE).

Dam
Bouçã Dam is a 63 m tall (height above foundation) and 175 m long double curvature arch dam with a crest altitude of 181 m. The volume of the dam is 70,000 m³. The dam features an uncontrolled spillway over the dam (maximum discharge 2,200 m³/s) and one bottom outlet (maximum discharge 200 m³/s).

Reservoir
At full reservoir level of 175 m the reservoir of the dam has a surface area of 5 km² and a total capacity of 48.4 mio. m³; its active capacity is 15.22 (7.9) mio. m³.

Power plant 
The hydroelectric power plant began operations in 1955. It is operated by EDP. The plant has a nameplate capacity of 44 (50) MW. Its average annual generation is 153.2 (140, 157,2 or 162) GWh.

The power station contains 2 Francis turbine-generators with 25 MW (28 MVA) each in a surface powerhouse at the right side of the dam. The turbine rotation is 214.3 rpm. The minimum hydraulic head is 52.5 m, the maximum 56.5 m. Maximum flow per turbine is 50 m³/s.

See also

 List of power stations in Portugal
 List of dams and reservoirs in Portugal

References

Dams in Portugal
Hydroelectric power stations in Portugal
Arch dams
Dams completed in 1955
Energy infrastructure completed in 1955
1955 establishments in Portugal
Buildings and structures in Leiria District